The Night Patrol is a 1926 American silent crime film directed by Noel M. Smith and starring Richard Talmadge, Rose Blossom and Mary Carr.

Plot
A Los Angeles police officer goes undercover to target a gang of thieves.

Cast
 Richard Talmadge as Tom Collins 
 Rose Blossom as Louise Hollister 
 Mary Carr as Mrs. Collins 
 Gardner James as Roy Hollister 
 Josef Swickard as John Pendleton 
 Grace Darmond as Goldie Ferguson 
 Victor Dillingham as Chuck Wolcott 
 Arthur Conrad (actor) as Terry the Rat

References

Bibliography
 Brent E. Walker. Mack Sennett’s Fun Factory: A History and Filmography of His Studio and His Keystone and Mack Sennett Comedies, with Biographies of Players and Personnel. McFarland, 2013.

External links
 

1926 films
1926 crime films
American silent feature films
American crime films
Films directed by Noel M. Smith
American black-and-white films
Film Booking Offices of America films
Films set in Los Angeles
1920s English-language films
1920s American films
Silent crime films